State Road 196 (NM 196) is a  state highway in the US state of New Mexico. NM 196's southern terminus is at Costilla Ski Basin, and the northern terminus is at NM 522 in Costilla.

Major intersections

See also

References

196
Transportation in Taos County, New Mexico